Statistics of Swedish football Division 3 for the 1963 season.

League standings

Norra Norrland 1963

Mellersta Norrland 1963

Södra Norrland 1963

Norra Svealand 1963

Östra Svealand 1963

Västra Svealand 1963

Nordöstra Götaland 1963

Nordvästra Götaland 1963

Mellersta Götaland 1963

Sydöstra Götaland 1963

Sydvästra Götaland 1963

Södra Götaland 1963

Footnotes

References 

Swedish Football Division 3 seasons
3
Swed
Swed